This is a list of the schools and colleges run by, or in association with, the Roman Catholic Church in New Zealand (including one private traditionalist Roman Catholic school).

Auckland Diocese

Hamilton Diocese

Palmerston North Diocese

Wellington Archdiocese

Christchurch Diocese

Dunedin Diocese

Secondary schools

Notes

   
Catholic
schools
New Zealand